Alain Lazare (born 23 March 1952) is a French long-distance runner. He competed in the marathon at the 1984 Summer Olympics and the 1988 Summer Olympics.  On January 27, 1985 he won the Hong Kong Marathon with a time of 2:18:34.

References

External links
 

1952 births
Living people
Athletes (track and field) at the 1984 Summer Olympics
Athletes (track and field) at the 1988 Summer Olympics
French male long-distance runners
French male marathon runners
Olympic athletes of France
Place of birth missing (living people)
20th-century French people
New Caledonian male athletes